Aphaenops hustachei is a species of beetle in the subfamily Trechinae. It was described by Jeannel in 1917.

References

hustachei
Beetles described in 1917